Aaron Abiob (1535–1605) was Turkish  rabbi of Salonica. He was the author of Oil of Myrrh, in the Yiddish known as Shemen ha-Mor (ex  Myrrhoe commentariis Oleum), and was commentary on the Book of Esther. He lived and flourished in Salonica about 1540' his work being first printed in 1601, and living for some time in Constantinople.

The name Aaron was given to the brother of Moses a person documented within the Torah, this biblical Aaron was the founder of the priesthood.

See also
History of the Jews in Thessaloniki

References 

 

1605 deaths
16th-century rabbis from the Ottoman Empire
16th-century Greek people
Jewish biblical scholars
Rabbis from Thessaloniki
1535 births
16th-century Jewish biblical scholars